Peter Lord CBE (born 1953) is an English animator, director, producer and co-founder of the Academy Award-winning Aardman Animations studio, an animation firm best known for its clay-animated films and shorts, particularly those featuring plasticine duo Wallace and Gromit. He also directed Chicken Run along with Nick Park, and The Pirates! Band of Misfits which was nominated for Best Animated Feature at the 85th Academy Awards.

Lord is the producer/executive producer of every Aardman work, including Chicken Run, Arthur Christmas and Flushed Away.

Life and career
Lord was born in Bristol, England. In co-operation with David Sproxton, a friend of his youth at school together in Woking in the 1960s, he realised his dream of "making and taking an animated movie". He graduated in English from the University of York in 1976. He and Sproxton founded Aardman as a low-budget backyard studio, producing shorts and trailers for publicity. Their work was first shown as part of the BBC TV series Vision On. In 1977 they created Morph, a stop-motion animated character made of Plasticine, who was usually a comic foil to the TV presenter Tony Hart. With his amoral friend Chas, he appeared in a series of children's art programmes including Take Hart, Hartbeat and Smart. From 1980 to 1981, Morph appeared in his own TV series The Amazing Adventures of Morph.

Experiments with animated clay characters synchronised with 'live' recorded soundtracks led to a series of films in the style of animated documentary. The first two were part of the BBC TV series Animated Conversations and were called "Down and Out" (1977) and "Confessions of a Foyer Girl" (1978) . These were followed in 1983 by Conversation Pieces, a series of five-minute long films produced for Channel 4. They were called "On Probation", Sales Pitch, "Palmy Days", "Late Edition" and "Early Bird".

In 1985 Nick Park joined the group.

Lord, Park and Sproxton developed and finalised their style of detailed and lovingly designed clay animation characters from stop motion techniques (though directed by Stephen Johnson their claymation is shown in the music video "Sledgehammer" (1986) by Peter Gabriel). In 1991 Lord animated Adam, a 6-minute clay animation that was nominated for an Academy Award.  Park created the "odd-couple" Wallace and Gromit-shorts in co-operation with Lord and Sproxton. All three together worked as producers, editors and directors. Other awarded productions by Peter Lord are Chicken Run (2000), the first feature film from Aardman and the Academy Award-winning Wallace & Gromit: The Curse of the Were-Rabbit (2005).

In 2006, Lord, Sproxton and Park were all given "the Freedom of the City of Bristol". In that same year, Lord (along with Sproxton) visited the "Aardman Exhibit" at the Ghibli Museum in Mitaka, Tokyo, Japan, where he met Hayao Miyazaki. Miyazaki has long been a fan of the Aardman Animation works. In 2013 Lord was nominated for Best Animated Feature at the 85th Academy Awards for Pirates! Band of Misfits.

Lord was made a Commander of the Order of the British Empire (CBE) on 17 June 2006.

On 9 July 2015, Lord received a Gold Blue Peter badge.

In August 2016, Lord was appointed a visiting professorship at Volda University College.

Three of Lord's films–War Story, Adam, and Wat's Pig–have been preserved by the Academy Film Archive.

In 2021, he was featured in the film Cartoon Carnival, a documentary about the origins of animation.

Filmography

Feature films

TV series

Shorts

Books
 Peter Lord & Brian Sibley: Cracking Animation (1998) Thames & Hudson;

References

External links

 
 
 Q&A With Peter Lord about The Pirates! Band of Misfits

1953 births
Living people
Aardman Animations people
Alumni of the University of York
British animated film directors
British television directors
British animated film producers
British television producers
Clay animators
Commanders of the Order of the British Empire
Film people from Bristol